The men's 100 metre backstroke event at the 1956 Olympic Games took place between 4 and 6 December. This swimming event used backstroke.  Because an Olympic size swimming pool is 50 metres long, this race consisted of two lengths of the pool.

Medalists

Results

Heats

Four heats were held; the swimmers with the sixteen fastest times advanced to the Semifinals.  The athletes that advanced are highlighted.

Heat One

Heat Two

Heat Three

Heat Four

Semifinals

Two heats were held; the swimmers with the eight fastest times advanced to the Finals.  The swimmers that advanced are highlighted.

Semifinal One

Semifinal Two

Final

Key: WR = World record

References

Men's backstroke 100 metre
Men's events at the 1956 Summer Olympics